Katha Sagar (translation:"A Sea of Stories") is an Indian television series that aired on DD National in 1986. The series featured a collection of stories by writers from around the world, including Katherine Mansfield, Guy De Maupassant, Leo Tolstoy, O. Henry, Anton Chekov etc. Each episode was directed by one of eight well known Indian directors, including Shyam Benegal, Kundan Shah, Ved Rahi and Satyen Bose. Most of the stories in the series were one-episode long.

Many years after its original run, the series was again produced by  Prem Krishen Malhotra and Sunil Mehta, founders of "Cinevista Communications Limited".

Plot
The series included about 37 stories based on different subjects like "Fear" by Guy De Maupassant, "The Overcoat" by Nikolai Gogol, "A Cup of Tea" by Katherine Mansfield, and Tolstoy's "Where Love Is, God Is" (Pratiksha) and many others. Some of the stories were adapted to fit an Indian context but the adaptation embodied the essence of the original story very well.

Episodes

Cast
The series featured some of the best actors of Indian TV & cinema at that time like:

 Sharmila Tagore
 Shammi Kapoor
 Om Puri
 Saeed Jaffrey
 Tiku Talsania
 Ashok Kumar
 Utpal Dutt
 Waheeda Rehman
 Moushumi Chatterjee
 Marc Zuber 
 Kulbhushan Kharbanda
 Anjan Srivastav
 Kiran Kumar
 Kitu Gidwani
 Archana Puran Singh
 Mangal Dhillon
 Shashi Puri
 Vijayendra Ghatge
 Vikram Gokhale
 Raza Murad
 Parikshit Sahni
 Beena 
 Neena Gupta
 Suresh Oberoi
 Pallavi Joshi
 Supriya Pathak
 Bindu
 Rohini Hattangadi
 Vishnu Sharma
 Radha Seth
 Satish Kaushik
 Bharat Bhushan
 Satyen Kappu
 Benjamin Gilani
 Lucky Ali
 Ajit Vachani
 Harish Patel
 K. K. Raina
 Iftekhar
 A. K. Hangal
 Anjana Mumtaz
 Irrfan Khan
 Ravi Jhankal
 Pankaj Berry
 Rajendra Gupta
 Lalit Tiwari
 Sulbha Deshpande
 Dina Pathak
 Sulabha Arya
 Rama Vij
 Naresh Suri
 Urmila Matondkar
 Shreeram Lagoo 
 Meera Madhuri 
 Suresh Oberoi

References

External links

Indian drama television series
1986 Indian television series debuts
Television shows based on short fiction
1980s Indian television series
1986 Indian television series endings
Indian anthology television series
DD National original programming
Adaptations of works by Leo Tolstoy
Adaptations of works by O. Henry
Adaptations of works by Arnold Bennett
Adaptations of works by Guy de Maupassant
Adaptations of works by August Strindberg
Adaptations of works by Anton Chekhov
Works by Saki
Short stories by Katherine Mansfield
Adaptations of works by Nikolai Gogol
Adaptations of works by Ivan Turgenev